Hypotia metasialis is a species of snout moth in the genus Hypotia. It was described by Hans Georg Amsel in 1954. It is found in Iran.

References

Moths described in 1954
Hypotiini